Maja Pavlinić (born 14 June 1997) is a Croatian badminton player. Pavlinić trained at the BK Medvedgrad 1998 with coach Igor Čimbur. As a junior player, she was a girls' doubles gold medalist at the 2014 European U17 Championships, and in 2015, she claimed double titles at the Polish Junior International tournament in the girls' singles and doubles events. In the senior event, she was a champion at the 2018 Slovenian International in the women's doubles. She represented her country competed at the 2014 Summer Youth Olympics in Nanjing, China and 2019 Minsk European Games.

She educated political science at the Zagreb University.

Achievements

BWF International Challenge/Series 
Women's singles

Women's doubles

  BWF International Challenge tournament
  BWF International Series tournament
  BWF Future Series tournament

References

External links 
 

1997 births
Living people
Croatian female badminton players
Badminton players at the 2014 Summer Youth Olympics
Badminton players at the 2019 European Games
European Games competitors for Croatia
21st-century Croatian women